Leonel Raúl Toro Linares (born 30 January 2002) is a Venezuelan footballer who plays as a defender for Caracas.

Career statistics

Club

Notes

References

2002 births
Living people
Venezuelan footballers
Venezuela youth international footballers
Association football defenders
Caracas FC players
21st-century Venezuelan people